Nahum is a biblical prophet.

Nahum or Nachum may also refer to:

Places
 Kfar Nahum, a fishing village established during the time of the Hasmoneans, located on the northern shore of the Sea of Galilee
 Sde Nahum, a kibbutz in the Beit She'an Valley in northern Israel

People

Mononym
 An ancestor of Jesus recorded by Luke, see

Given name

Nahum
 Nahum (artist) (born 1979), Mexican contemporary artist and musician
 Nahum (exilarch), Jewish exilarch of the 2nd century AD residing within the Parthian Empire
 Nahum Admoni (born 1929), former Israeli intelligence officer
 Nahum Barnea (born 1944), Israeli journalist
 Nahum Barnet (1855–1931), architect working in Melbourne, Victoria, Australia
 Nahum Benari (1893–1963), Israeli writer and intellectual
 Nahum Buch (born 1932), Israeli Olympic swimmer
 Nahum Capen (1804–1886), writer, editor, bookseller and publisher in Boston
 Nahum Eitingon (1899–1981), Soviet intelligence officer
 Nahúm Espinoza (born 1964), Honduran football player and football manager
 Nahum Gergel (1887–1931), Jewish rights activist, humanitarian, sociologist, and author in Yiddish
 Nahum Galmor (born 1948), Italian-Israeli industrialist residing in Switzerland
 Nahum Goldmann Nahum Goldmann (1895–1982), Israeli Zionist
 Nahúm Gómez (born 1998), Mexican professional footballer
 Nahum Grymes (born 1981), better known by his stage name J. Holiday, American singer, songwriter, rapper and actor
 Nahum Het (1896–1990), Israeli politician 
 Nahum Hofree (born 1952), former mayor of Ra'anana, Israel, and former principal of Ostrovsky High School in Ra'anana
 Nahum J. Bachelder (1854–1934), 49th governor of New Hampshire from 1903 to 1905 
 Nahum Korzhavin (1925–2018), Russian poet
 Nahum Leonard (1876–1927), co-founder of the American college fraternity Kappa Delta Phi
 Nahum Levin (1905–1967), Israeli politician
 Nahum M. Sarna (1923–2005), modern biblical scholar
 Nahum Ma'arabi, Moroccan Hebrew poet and translator of the thirteenth century
 Nahum Manbar (born 1946), Israeli businessman
 Nahum Meir Schaikewitz (1849–1905), Yiddish and Hebrew novelist and playwright
 Nahum Melvin-Lambert (born 2002), English footballer
 Nahum Mitchell (1769–1853), U.S. Representative from Massachusetts
 Nahum Nardi (1901–1977), Ukraine-born Israeli composer
 Nahum Nir (1884–1968), Zionist activist, Israeli politician
 Nahum Norbert Glatzer (1903–1990), scholar of Jewish history and philosophy from antiquity to mid 20th century
 Nahum Olin (born 1957), Mexican race car driver
 Nahum Orobitg (born 1971), Andorran alpine skier
 Nahum Parker (1760–1839), United States Senator from New Hampshire
 Nahum Rabinovitch (1928–2020), Canadian-Israeli religious Zionist rabbi and posek
 Nahum Sharfman, (died 2009), Israeli tech entrepreneur and co-founder of Shopping.com
 Nahum Slouschz (1872–1966), Russian-born Israeli writer, translator and archaeologist
 Nahum Sokolow (1859–1936), Zionist leader, author, translator, and journalist
 Nahum Sonenberg (born 1946), Israeli-Canadian microbiologist and biochemist 
 Nahum Stelmach (1936–1999), Israeli football player and manager
 Nahum Stutchkoff (1893–1965), Yiddish-Polish and later Yiddish-American actor, author, lexicographer, and radio host
 Nahum Tate (1652–1715), Irish poet, hymnist and lyricist
 Nahum Tevet (born 1946‎), Israeli sculptor
 Nahum Trebitsch (1779–1842), Czech rabbi
 Nahum Tschacbasov (1899–1984), Russian-born American painter, teacher
 Nahum Zolotov (1926–2014), Israeli architect
 Nahum the Mede, first-century tanna of the first generation

Nachum
 Nachum Dershowitz (born 1951), Israeli computer scientist
 Nachum Dov Brayer (born 1959), rebbe of the Boyan Hasidic dynasty
 Nachum Eisenstein, rabbi of the Ma'alot Dafna neighborhood, Jerusalem, Israel
 Nachum Ish Gamzu, tanna of the second generation (first century)
 Nachum Kaplan (1811–1879), Lithuanian Talmudist, philanthropist, and Talmid Chacham
 Nachum Gutman (1898–1980), Modovan-born Israeli painter, sculptor, and author
 Nachum Heiman (1934–2016), Israeli composer and musician
 Nachum Neriya (born 1941), rosh yeshiva of Torah Betziyon in Efrat, Israel
 Nachum Segal (born 1963), American radio disc jockey
 Nachum Shifren (born c. 1951), Orthodox Lubavitcher Chassidic rabbi and surfer
 Nachum Zev Dessler (1921–2011), Orthodox Jewish rabbi

Middle name
 Abraham Nahum Stencl (1897–1983), Polish-born Yiddish poet
 Menachem Nachum Twersky (1730–1787), Ukrainian rabbi

Surname

Nahum
 Ana Nahum (1969–2015), Uruguayan journalist, writer, and presenter
 Benjamín Nahum (born 1937), Uruguayan historian, father of Ana Nahum
 Bertin Nahum (born 1969), French-Beninese entrepreneur, founder of Medtech
 Chaim Nahum (1872–1960), Jewish scholar, jurist, and linguist 
 Claudia Nahum (born 1983), better known by her stage name Baby K, Italian-British singer, songwriter and rapper
 Jacques Nahum (1921–2017), French director, screenwriter, and producer
 Perrine Simon-Nahum (born 1960), contemporary French historian
 Peter Nahum (born 1947), English art dealer, author, lecturer and journalist
 Ricardo Dájer Nahum (born 1955), Mexican politician
 Stirling Henry Nahum (1906–1956), known professionally as Baron, society and court photographer in the United Kingdom

Nachum
 Eliad Nachum (born 1990), Israeli singer, songwriter and television actor known professionally as Eliad
 Nir Nachum (born 1983), Israeli footballer
 Rogel Nachum (born 1967), Israeli Olympic triple jumper
 Roy Nachum (born 1979), Israeli artist

Other uses
 The Book of Nahum, prophetic book in the Hebrew and Christian Bibles
 Nahum Commentary, among the Dead Sea Scrolls
 An alternate name for the demon Aamon

See also
 Naum (disambiguation)